United Federal Credit Union (UFCU) is a federally chartered credit union based in St. Joseph, Michigan with a 74-year history. Originally chartered in 1949, UFCU has more than 186,000 Members in all 50 states and the District of Columbia. The credit union assets in excess of $3.8 billion as of December 2022. United has 35 branches in six states: Michigan, Ohio, Indiana, Nevada, North Carolina, and Arkansas. United Federal Credit Union offers a diverse array of products and services for businesses and individuals, include checking and savings accounts; auto loans, RV and boat loans, credit cards; mortgage, construction, and lot loans; home equity loans, and lines of credit; business accounts, loans, and credit cards.

History

United Federal Credit Union’s origins date to the 1930s and 1940s, when the Nineteen Hundred Employee Credit Union (NHECU), and the Buchanan Clark Employee Credit Union (BCECU), were originally formed to serve the employees of the companies that would ultimately become the Whirlpool Corporation and the Clark Equipment Company. NHECU formed in 1949 with eight employees and volunteers who handled the transactions. Nineteen Hundred Corporation became Whirlpool Corporation in 1950, and the credit union became Whirlpool Employee Federal Credit Union (WEFCU).

By 1955, WEFCU’s assets reached $1 million. By 1958, assets doubled to $2 million. Assets more than doubled again over the next five years, and in 1963, WEFCU moved into a brand new building in St. Joseph, MI. In 1969, BCECU became Clark Credit Union, and a short time later, Clark Federal Credit Union. Explosive growth continued for WEFCU between 1963 and 1978, requiring the credit union to relocate to 2900 South State Street in downtown St. Joseph. Assets exceeded $30 million, with 15,800 Members and 27 employees.

Beginning in 1980, WEFCU merged with credit unions serving Whirlpool subsidiaries in Marion, OH and Fort Smith, AR. In 1987, CFCU reached $50 million in assets and changed their name to United Federal Credit Union (UFCU) while WEFCU because Whirlpool Community Federal Credit Union (WCFCU). Then in 1992, WCFCU changed again to the First Resource Federal Credit Union (FRFCU). During the 1990s, both FRFCU and UFCU broke ground on new corporate headquarters buildings, located in St. Joseph, MI, and Buchanan, MI, respectively.

New branches opened in Holland, MI in 2000, and in 2006, FRFCU merged with UFCU. All locations adopted the UFCU name, but the headquarters remained in St. Joseph and retained the FRFCU charter number.

In 2009, growth continued with the acquisition of Clearstar Financial Credit Union in Reno, NV. In 2011, UFCU purchased Griffith Savings Bank in Griffith, IN, marking the first time a bank had been purchased by a federally chartered credit union. As of 2012, assets reached $1.5 billion with plans in progress for an expanded corporate headquarters.

In October 2015 Lake Michigan Credit Union and United Federal Credit Union announced their intent to merge. The merger did not occur.

United moved corporate headquarters in December 2020 with the completion of a renovation project at 150 Hilltop Road in St. Joseph, Michigan which was a former Whirlpool Corporation corporate building.

Two mergers occurred in 2021 when United acquired a branch in Springdale, Arkansas from Truity Credit Union in February, and completed its acquisition of Edgewater Bank in St. Joseph, Michigan in April.

Timeline

Products and services

United Federal Credit Union provides products and services to individuals and businesses. For Individual Members, there are checking accounts, long or short-term savings options including IRAs or HSAs; mortgage, auto, and equity loans; lines of credit for debt consolidation; and investment planning options. UFCU also offers a Member Assistance Program to help Members work through debt concerns.

UFCU also offers Business Members access to loans, checking accounts, and cash management options, as well as payroll management and merchant services.

References

External links
 United Federal Credit Union — official site
 United Diamond Insurance
 Allied Solutions Insurance Products
 Whirlpool Corporation
 American Consumer Council
 National Credit Union Association

Credit unions based in Michigan
Banks established in 1949
Organizations established in 1949
St. Joseph, Michigan